Lacaune (meaning the cave) is a commune in the Tarn department in southern France.

Its inhabitants are called the Lacaunais (los Cauneses in Occitan).

Geography
The river Gijou has its source in the commune.

History
In 1797, the feral child Victor of Aveyron was looked after at Lacaune for a week after first being discovered in the woods, before running away.

Points of interest
Arboretum de Calmels

See also
 Communes of the Tarn department
 Tourism in Tarn

References

Communes of Tarn (department)